The Best of Scarface is a second compilation album by rapper Scarface. The first compilation album was Greatest Hits (2002). The album is presented in a Mixtape format with nearly all of the songs edited for time length.

Track listing
 "Intro"
 "Mr. Scarface, pt. 2"
 "Murder by Reason of Insanity"
 "Body Snatcher"
 "Diary of a Madman"
 "Interlude 1"
 "Money and the Power"
 "Good Girl Gone Bad"
 "Lettin' 'em Know"
 "The Wall"
 "You Don't Hear Me Though"
 "Dying with Ya Boots on"
 "Now I Feel Ya"
 "Mr. Scarface, pt. 3"
 "Interlude 2"
 "White Sheet"
 "Jesse James"
 "Seen a Man Die"
 "Hand of the Dead Body"
 "Interlude 3"
 "Mind Playin' Tricks '94"
 "No Warning"
 "Interlude 4"
 "Sunshine"
 "Mary Jane"
 "Smile"
 "Game Over"
 "Interlude 5"
 "Homies and Thugs (Remix)"
 "Fuck Faces"
 "You Owe Me"
 "Interlude 6"
 "It Ain't, pt. 2"
 "Get Out"
 "Guess Who's Back?"
 "My Block"
 "In Between Us"

2008 compilation albums
Scarface (rapper) albums
Gangsta rap compilation albums